"Odio" (English: "Hate") is a song written and performed by American singer Romeo Santos featuring Canadian rapper Drake Released as the second single for his second studio album Formula, Vol. 2.

It jumped to the number one spot on the Hot Latin Songs chart and was the highest debut for a Spanish song on the Billboard Hot 100 chart, where it peaked at number 45. Since its release it has spent thirteen consecutive weeks atop the Hot Latin Songs chart. Furthermore, it has sold 147,000 copies in the United States. "Odio" was certified Platinum in the Latin digital field by the RIAA signifying 60,000 digital downloads.

Charts

Weekly charts

Year-end charts

Decade-end charts

All-time charts

Certification

See also
 List of number-one Billboard Hot Latin Songs of 2014

References

2014 singles
Bachata songs
Romeo Santos songs
Drake (musician) songs
Songs written by Romeo Santos
Spanish-language songs
Songs written by Drake (musician)
Songs written by Rico Love
Sony Music Latin singles
2014 songs
Male vocal duets
Songs written by 40 (record producer)
Songs written by Earl Hood
Songs written by Eric Goudy